Arjan Jagt (born 1 September 1966) is a Dutch retired cyclist who won the bronze medal in the road race at the 1986 UCI Road World Championships. He also won the Ronde van Limburg (1987), Grand Prix of Aargau Canton (1988) and one stage of Tour of Austria (1986).

Major results
1985
 3rd Overall Olympia's Tour
1986
 2nd Overall Flèche du Sud
1987
 1st Ronde van Limburg
1988
 1st Grand Prix of Aargau Canton
 1st Stage 4 International Tour of Hellas
1989
 5th Le Samyn

References

1966 births
Living people
Dutch male cyclists
People from Assen
UCI Road World Championships cyclists for the Netherlands
Cyclists from Drenthe
20th-century Dutch people
21st-century Dutch people